Santa Rosa Formation may refer to:
 Santa Rosa Formation, New Mexico, Triassic geologic formation of New Mexico
 Santa Rosa Formation, Colombia, Lower Cretaceous geologic formation of Colombia

See also
 Santa Rosa Group, a geologic group in Belize and Guatemala